"Vauvoja" is a song by Finnish singer Kasmir from his forthcoming second studio album. The song features Finnish singer Saara. It was released on 15 May 2015 through Universal Music Finland, with its official music video being released on 23 May. The song has reached the number-one position on the Finnish downloads and airplay charts, while it's reached the top five on the singles chart. "Vauvoja" is the Kesäkumi song of 2015.

Composition
"Vauvoja" is a pop and funk song that plays for a total of 3:49. It was written by Kasmir, Saara, Hank Solo, Jonas W. Karlsson, and Mikko Kuoppala, while it was produced by Kasmir, Saara, and Kuoppala.

Music video
The song's official music video was released on 23 May 2015 through Universal Music Finland's YouTube channel. It features the two singers swapping traditional gender roles with Kasmir portraying female stereotypes and Saara portraying male stereotypes.

Charts

References

2015 singles
2015 songs
Universal Music Group singles
Kasmir (singer) songs
Saara (singer) songs
Songs written by Sara Forsberg
Songs written by Jonas W. Karlsson